The 2014 CIS Women's Volleyball Championship was held February 28, 2014 to March 2, 2014, in Regina, Saskatchewan, to determine a national champion for the 2013–14 CIS women's volleyball season. The tournament was played at the Centre for Kinesiology, Health & Sport (CKHS) at the University of Regina. It was the first time that the University of Regina had hosted the tournament.

The second-seeded Manitoba Bisons defeated the six-time defending champion and top-seeded UBC Thunderbirds in the gold-medal match as they won the seventh title in program history. The Bisons swept all three of their opponents during this tournament and won their first championship since 2002. With the loss, the Thunderbirds were unable to win a record-breaking seventh consecutive championship as they finished tied with the Winnipeg Wesmen (1983-1988) and Alberta Pandas (1995-2000) with six straight wins from 2008 to 2013.

Participating teams

Championship bracket

Consolation bracket

Awards

Championship awards 
 CIS Championship MVP – Rachel Cockrell, Manitoba
 R.W. Pugh Fair Play Award – Katherine Ryan, Dalhousie

All-Star Team 
Lisa Barclay, UBC
Rachel Cockrell, Manitoba
Esther Gilbert, Laval
Brittany Habing, Manitoba
Abbey Keeping, UBC
Desiree Nouwen, Dalhousie
Taylor Pischke, Manitoba

References

External links 
 Tournament Web Site

U Sports volleyball
2014 in women's volleyball
University of Regina